Arthur Yager Miliam (1889March 26, 1956) was a developer and legislator in Florida. A Democrat, he represented Duval County in 1923 and 1925, and was Speaker of the House in 1925.

He was the son of Bob R. Milam and Lula J. Milam, née Yager.

He was admitted to the U.S. Military Academy in 1907. He was later listed as a non graduate.

He was a developer of Davis Shores development on Anastasia Island with his brother R. R. Milam. The project required extensive dredging and faltered as Florida's land boom slowed in the later 1920s.

The Florida archives have a photo of Milam and other members of the 1923 Florida House of Representatives.

He died in Jacksonville, Florida, on March 26, 1956.

References

Speakers of the Florida House of Representatives
Democratic Party members of the Florida House of Representatives
1889 births
1956 deaths
20th-century American politicians